Faculty of Earth Sciences (FES) is a specialized geology college in the Middle East. It was founded in the beginning as the Applied Geological Center belonging to the Ministry of Petroleum and Mineral Resources of Saudi Arabia. Later it became one of the King Abdulaziz University schools. The faculty currently has seven geoscience departments:
 Mineral Resources & Rocks 
 Petroleum Geology & Sedimentation
 Hydrology
 Geophysics
 Structural Geology & Remote Sensing
 Engineering & Environmental Geology
 Technical Training Department (offer diploma only)

The FES offers programs leading to a Bachelor of Science (B.S.), Master of Science (M.S.) and Doctor of Philosophy (Ph.D.) degree in most departments mentioned above. The Faculty presently includes 65 full-time faculty members and professors and 23 labs.

External links
 

1970 establishments in Saudi Arabia
Educational institutions established in 1970
Universities and colleges in Saudi Arabia
Geology organizations
Science and technology in Saudi Arabia
Scientific organisations based in Saudi Arabia